The 1999 Chattanooga Mocs football team represented the University of Tennessee at Chattanooga as a member of the Southern Conference (SoCon) in the 1999 NCAA Division I-AA football season. The Mocs were led by sixth-year head coach Buddy Green and played their home games at Finley Stadium. They finished the season 5–6 overall and 3–5 in play to place sixth .

Schedule

References

Chattanooga
Chattanooga Mocs football seasons
Chattanooga Mocs football